Barton Creek Cave is a natural cave in Belize, known as both an archaeological site and as a tourist destination. It is located in the upper Barton Creek area near San Ignacio in the Cayo District.

Description 
Barton Creek Cave is a primarily single-passage resurging stream cave.

Archaeology 
Extensive looting of artifacts occurred soon after the cave was first reported, but it remains an important site for archaeologists.  Evidence of cave use by the Maya exists on ten ledges within the first kilometer of cave passage. Pottery shards indicate use between the Early Classic (200 to 600 CE) to the Late Classic (600 to 900 CE) periods. The remains of at least 28 humans have been found within the cave.

References
 Larson, David and Eleanor. Multiyear Project to Map Caves for the Belize Department of Archaeology, 2002 NSS Convention
 Larson et al. "Report on Multiyear Project to Map and Photograph Caves for the Belize Institute of Archaeology", 14th International Congress of Speleology

External links
 http://www.caves.org/pub/journal/PDF/V64/v64n3-Abstracts.pdf
 https://web.archive.org/web/20151223084118/http://www.nichbelize.org/ia-archaeological-sites-parks/archaeology-of-barton-creek.html

Cayo District
Caves of Belize
Limestone caves
Maya sites in Belize
Cave sites in Mesoamerican archaeology